Sporto Kantes are a French electronic music band, founded in 1998.

Career
The band was born from the meeting of Benjamin Sportes and Nicolas Kantorovwicz, bassist of Les Wampas. Sportes played Rockabilly in the 80's with Eduardo Leal de la Gala, (Wreckless Eric/Ltno, Gala and the Muzer) and Kantorovwicz thrash, but they play a melt of genres in their album: dub, jazz, reggae, hip hop, and also Brazilian music. The band have worked from samples with an Akai S 2000 on their tracks.

In popular culture
Their song "Slits" appears in the first episode of season 6 of the TV show Skins.
Their song "Lee" was used as a theme for the French comedy series Kaboul Kitchen on Canal+ in 2012.
Their song "Whistle" was used in the ad campaign for the Renault Twingo II in 2012.
Their song "Whistle" is featured in the French film Blue is the Warmest Colour (2013) during Adèle's birthday party scene.

Discography

Albums

Maxis

Compilation albums
2000: Catalogue 2000
2002: Catalogue 2002
2002: The Catalogue of...

Singles

References

External links
 Sporto Kantes Website
 Sporto Kantes on Myspace
 Sporto Kantes on Last.fm
 Sporto Kantes on Grandcrew.com

French electronic music groups